White Carpathians Protected Landscape Area is the English name of two protected areas:
Biele Karpaty Protected Landscape Area in Slovakia
Bílé Karpaty Protected Landscape Area in the Czech Republic